Ravenel is a surname. Notable people with the surname include:

Arthur Ravenel, Jr. (1927-2023), an American businessman and politician
Arthur Ravenel Jr. Bridge, South Carolina, United States
Beatrice Ravenel (1870–1956), American poet
Beatrice St. Julien Ravenel (1904–1990), American writer
Charles D. Ravenel (1938-2017), American politician
Douglas Ravenel (born 1947), American mathematician
Harriott Horry Ravenel (1832–1912), American writer and historian
Henry William Ravenel (1814–1887), American botanist
St. Julien Ravenel (1819–1882), American physician and chemist
Thomas Ravenel (born 1962), former State Treasurer of South Carolina
William Bee Ravenel III, (1914–1968), educator and soldier

See also
William Ravenel House in South Carolina, United States